Francesco Antonio Mamiliano Pistocchi, nicknamed Pistocchino (165913 May 1726), was an Italian singer, composer and librettist.

Pistocchino was born in Palermo. He was a boy soprano prodigy, and later made his career as a castrato. From 1696 to 1700 he was maestro di cappella for the Duke of Ansbach. 

After 1700, he founded a singing school in Bologna, where he died. He was elected president of the Academia Filarmonica twice, in 1708 and 1710.

His pupil was Annibale Pio Fabri.

Works
 Il Leandro (libretto by Camillo Badovero, Venice, Teatro alle Zattere, 5 May 1679, then Teatro S. Moisè, 1682, as Gli amori fatali)
 Il Narciso, pastorale (Apostolo Zeno Ansbach Court Theatre, March 1697)
 Le pazzie d'amore e dell'interesse, (own libretto, Ansbach, 16 June 1699)
 Le risa di Democrito (Nicolò Minato,  Vienna, 17 February 1700)
 La pace tra l'armi, serenata (own libretto, Ansbach 5 Sept. 1700)
.  Bertoldo (1707)
 I rivali generosi, dramma per musica (Apostolo Zeno, Reggio Emilia, April 1710), composed with Clemente Monati and Giovanni Maria Capelli

Oratorios
. Il Martirio di San Adriano (Venice,1699)
. Maria Vergine Addolorata (1698)
. La fuga di Sta. Teresia (1717)

Other works
. Scherzi Musicali (collection of French, Italian and German arias)
. Duetti e terzetti(1707)
. 147th psalm and other church music and cantatas
. Cappricci puerili variamente composti in 40 modi sopra un basso d'un balletto (pieces for the harpsichord, harp, violin and other instruments 1667)

Recordings
 Oratorio San Adriano'' Symphonia

References

External links
 

1659 births
1726 deaths
Italian Baroque composers
Castrati
Italian male classical composers
Italian librettists
18th-century Italian male opera singers
17th-century Italian male opera singers
17th-century Italian composers
18th-century Italian composers